Orchard Cook (March 24, 1763 – August 12, 1819) was a U.S. Representative from Massachusetts.

Born in Salem in the Province of Massachusetts Bay, Cook attended the public schools, and engaged in mercantile pursuits.
He served as Assessor of Pownalborough in 1786,and Town clerk of New Milford, in the District of Maine from 1795 to 1797.  He was a Justice of the Peace, served as judge of the court of common pleas for Lincoln County 1799–1810,  was appointed assistant assessor of the twenty-fifth district in November 1798, and served as overseer of Bowdoin College from 1800 to 1805.

Cook was elected as a Democratic-Republican to the Ninth, Tenth, and Eleventh Congresses (March 4, 1805 – March 3, 1811).
He was not a candidate for renomination in 1810.  He then served as Sheriff of Lincoln County in 1811, and Postmaster of Wiscasset in Massachusetts' District of Maine from 1811 until his death there August 12, 1819.  He was interred in Evergreen Cemetery.

Sources

1763 births
1819 deaths
People from Wiscasset, Maine
Politicians from Salem, Massachusetts
Bowdoin College people
Massachusetts Democratic-Republicans
Maine sheriffs
Democratic-Republican Party members of the United States House of Representatives from the District of Maine
Members of the United States House of Representatives from Massachusetts